The Étretat Gardens is a cliff-top experimental garden with "living sculptures" in Étretat, Normandy, France. It surrounds a villa that once belonged to Madame Thébault, an actress from Paris, in the beginning of the 20th century. More than a century later, the garden was restored by a team led by the Russian landscape architect Alexander Grivko of the British garden design and landscaping company IL Nature, who was inspired by the flora of the Normandy coast. It was reopened to the public in 2017. 

Grivko was awarded the 2019/2020 European Garden Award in "Best restoration or development of a historic park or garden" category for his work. The Étretat Gardens are listed among "Great Gardens of the World" and also received a star from the Michelin Green Guide.

History 

In 1905, Thébault became the owner of a Belle Époque house built on the Amont Cliff in Étretat, in the heart of a  park. Thébault named the house "Villa Roxelane", a reference to Hurrem Sultan, the legendary wife of Sultan Suleiman the Magnificent, a role once played by Thébault that brought her recognition as an actress. Thébault called upon local landscape designer Auguste Lecanu to develop the land. Some of the then-planted trees are now over a hundred years old and well preserved.

Thébault was friends with French painter Claude Monet, who regularly came to the gardens to paint. Inspired by the Étretat cliffs, Monet created his painting series , whilst inspiring Thébault to create an avant-garde garden at the clifftop. A vine sculpture on the terrace of the garden pays tribute to Monet's influence. It depicts the painter working on his "Coucher de soleil à Etretat" painting.

The majority of the garden's historical elements were recreated during the restoration, which started in 2015. Alexander Grivko, together with Natalia Bogomolova, Marcel Gherghelejiu, Vera Kalashnik, Valeriya Kanavina, Alina Trunova, Inna Korneeva, and Elena Popova, implemented methods borrowed from André Le Nôtre, the royal gardener of the Gardens of Versailles.

Gardens

Jardin Avatar
The Jardin Avatar garden is the first garden after the entrance. It has an art installation called "Clockwork Forest", which was created by Greyworld, a collective of London-based artists who create public-activated art, sculpture, and interactive installations. Visitors who turn the key, will hear a melody, as if they brought to life an additional layer of sound organically existing in the natural environment.

There's also a large seashell, made of plastic membrane, by artist Alyona Kogan from Saint Petersburg, Russia. A gigantic trunk of an old oak tree served as material for the installation called "Platter", a large dining plate in the forest, by German sculptor Thomas Rösler.

Jardin Émotions 
Jardin Émotions has been modeled on the first French oyster farm that was located at the foot of Étretat cliffs and was founded by the Queen Marie Antoinette. The farm is commemorated by shrubs of Buxus sempervirens (boxwood) and Enkianthus that were shaped to represent mollusk shells. The garden contains the art installation "Drops of Rain" ("Gouttes de Plui" in French) by Spanish artist Samuel Salcedo: seven large faces depicting various human emotions. The faces were made from a mixture of polyester resin and aluminium powder.

Jardin Impressions 
The Jardin Impressions garden opens up a panorama of the English Channel and the cliffs of Étretat, which have inspired many different artists, aside from Monet, in the past: Jean-Baptiste-Camille Corot, Eugène Delacroix, Édouard Manet, and Vasily Polenov.

Jardin d'Aval
The Jardin d'Aval boasts a collection of orchids in memory of Thébault. In to the archives that came with the purchase of the house, Thébault's orchid collection was detailed in the papers of her gardener, Auguste Lecanu.

Jardin d'Aval was inspired by Alice in Wonderland and features yew arches, which mimic the stone arches on the coastline. There are installations by both Thomas Rösler (a 10-meter-long furniture set made from solid oak) and The Tree Hugger Project (sculptures made of dried branches and scraps of wood that depict "a hundred ways to embrace a tree without being ridiculous").

Jardin Zen
Jardin Zen, which features white rhododendrons, embodies a harmonious coexistence of man and nature, growing only plants with white blossoms and featuring an audio installation. There is a wooden decking walkway, leading visitors past a tall ledge of bamboo. An installation by the Russian artist Sergey Katran features an array of terracotta sculptures shaped like the sound waves of the word "art" uttered in different languages.

Jardin La Manche
The Jardin La Manche garden is located in the center of the Étretat Gardens. It is something of a maze with large-scale trimmed plants reflecting the crashing waves below – even the silvery color of the leaves is a nod to the ocean. The panoramic view of the English Channel and the cliffs opens in this garden.

Jardin d'Amont
Jardin d'Amont was set at the top of Amont Cliff (Cliff d’Amont in French), which gave the garden its name. Jardin d'Amont is the highest section of the Étretat Gardens, where topiary is arranged in staggered tiers that progress up the hillside, providing a panoramic view of the garden and the landscape beyond. Plants morphing into cliffs and merging with the shoreline of the horizon imitate the rocky layers of the white cliffs of the Normandy's Côte d'Albâtre (Alabaster Coast).

References 

Gardens in Normandy
20th-century establishments in France